Marusya Bociurkiw (born May 25, 1958) is a Canadian born, Ukrainian  film-maker, writer, scholar, and activist. She has published six books, including a novel, poetry collection, short story collection, and a memoir. Her narrative and critical writing have been published in a variety of journals and collections. Bociurkiw has also directed and co-directed ten films and videos which have been screened at film festivals on several continents. Her work appears in the collections of the National Gallery of Canada, the National Archives of Canada, and many university libraries. She founded or co-founded the media organizations Emma Productions, Winds of Change Productions, and The Studio for Media Activism & Critical Thought. She currently lives in Toronto, Ontario, Canada where she is an associate professor in the RTA School of Media Studies, Toronto Metropolitan University (previously Ryerson University). She teaches courses on social justice media, activist media production, and gender/race/queer theories of time-based and digital media. She is also Director of The Studio for Media Activism & Critical Thought at Toronto Metropolitan University.

Early years

Bociurkiw was born in Edmonton, Alberta to Vera Anne (née Wasylyshyn) and Bohdan Rostyslav Bociurkiw,. Her father was co-founder of the Canadian Institute of Ukrainian Studies. Ukrainian history and culture were central to Bociurkiw's childhood, and instilled in her a sense of Ukrainian identity and history, as well as a desire to rewrite that history. This is a common thread throughout Bociurkiw's books, essays, and films: reflecting critically and intersectionally on what it means to be Ukrainian, Canadian, feminist, and lesbian. Ksenya Kiebuzinski, of the Petro Jacyk program for the Study of Ukraine at the Munk School of Global Affairs, has said that Bociurkiw’s work brings awareness of the diversity that exists within the Ukraine. “She’s changing people’s attitudes,” said Kiebuzinski, in an article in Ryerson University's The Eyeopener.

Education and career

Bociurkiw completed her Bachelor of Fine Arts (1982) at the Nova Scotia College of Art and Design (NSCAD) University. While there, she discovered feminist art and the new field of video art. She studied with Bruce Barber and Garry Neill Kennedy. She was part of what Barber has called "the gathering momentum of a feminist movement at NSCAD", co-founding the Women Artists' File at the NSCAD Library, which later inspired the Toronto-based Women's Art Resource Centre. She was active on the board of the Centre for Art Tapes in Halifax, where she curated a Toronto-Halifax exchange of activist performance art entitled "Performance As Resistance" (1985), which featured dub poets Lillian Allen and Clifton Joseph, humourist Sheila Gostick and Halifax a capella group Four The Moment.

After graduating from NSCAD, she moved to Toronto and in 1983, collectively produced the documentary, Our Choice, A Tape About Teenage Mothers (Women's Media Alliance). In 1984, she co-founded the feminist video collective, Emma Productions, which produced several works, including No Small Change: The Story of the Eaton's Strike (dir. Ruth Bishop & Marusya Bociurkiw 1985) and Bullets for a Revolution (dir. Marusya Bociurkiw 1988). These films were produced and screened in the context of the dynamic feminist media culture in 1980's Toronto. No Small Change: The Story of the Eaton's Strike and Bociurkiw's own film Playing with Fire (1986) were included in a 1989-1990 touring exhibition called Rebel Girls: A Survey of Canadian Feminist Videotapes 1974-1988. These were followed by several more single-authored works, including Unspoken Territory, about the history of racial profiling in Canada; and the more recent This is Gay Propaganda: LGBT Rights and the War in Ukraine (2015). This film uses interviews with LGBT Ukrainians to explore the role of queer activists in Ukraine's Euromaidan Revolution and the Russian occupation that followed. Bociurkiw's films have screened at film festivals on several continents.

Bociurkiw is also an award-winning writer and media studies scholar. Her narrative and critical writing have been widely published in such journals and collections as Border/Lines, Fuse, Rites Magazine, The Journey Prize Anthology (McClelland & Stewart), Dykewords (Women's Press), Queer Looks (Routledge), Two Lands, New Vision (Coteau) and Unbound: Ukrainian Canadians Writing Home (University of Toronto Press). In 1994, Bociurkiw published her first book, The Woman Who Loved Airports (Press Gang) a collection of short stories, followed by a poetry collection, Halfway to the East (Lazara Press 1999). In 1999, she completed an MA in Social and Political Thought, at York University (Toronto, Ontario, Canada). Bociurkiw's creative and scholarly careers have always been intertwined. While teaching sessional positions, completing a PhD in Interdisciplinary Studies at the University of British Columbia (2005) and later working as a Professor in the Radio and Television Arts (RTA) School of Media, Ryerson University (2007 to present), she completed her first novel, The Children of Mary (Inanna 2006), and her award-winning memoir, Comfort Food for Breakups (Arsenal 2007). In 2011, she published the academic book, Feeling Canadian: Television Nationalism & Affect (Wilfrid Laurier University Press).

Bociurkiw promotes feminist and anti-racist pedagogy and research through the Studio for Media Activism & Critical Thought, a research hub at Ryerson University that blurs the boundaries between media art, activism, and scholarly investigation. It organizes a yearly speakers' series, symposia, student mentorship, and an online graduate journal. In 2015, the Studio's Speaker Series—which is open to Ryerson students, faculty and the public—featured Indigenous Scholar, Dr. Raven Sinclair; media artist, Deanna Bowen; and anti-poverty activists  Cathy Crowe. More recently, The Studio has organized the annual Laboratory for Feminist Memory, that celebrates and remediates the archive of Toronto second wave feminism – especially its intersectional, racialized and queer aspects., featuring such artists as Midi Onodera, Thirza Cuthand, and Zainub Verjee.

Activism

As founder of the feminist video collective Emma Productions, and as an out queer, Bociurkiw was very active in the Toronto and Vancouver feminist movement, peace, and LGBT social movements throughout the 1980s, 1990s and 2000s. In the 1980s, she was active in Women's Action for Peace, International Women's Day Coalition, the pro-choice movement, the Latin American solidarity movement, and Women for Economic Justice While living in Montreal, she co-designed and co-taught the first course on LGBT cinema in Canada, at Concordia University, with Thomas Waugh. She was among the first group of women in Canada to enter the male-dominated field of media art, and to use film and video to draw attention to women's, labour and other issues.

Bociurkiw's most recent film—This is Gay Propaganda: LGBT Rights and the War in Ukraine—highlights the role of LGBT activists in the 2013 Euromaidan and 2014 Ukrainian revolution, which culminated in the expulsion of Ukrainian President Viktor Yanukovych. LGBT people in Ukraine had a lot to lose from the rise of Russian political influences there. As a result of the illegal occupation and annexation of Crimea by the Russian Federation in 2014—bringing it under the Russian LGBT propaganda law—many LGBT Ukrainians from Crimea and Donetsk were forced to flee to safe houses in Kyiv and Odessa. Though the law criminalizing same sex sexual activity under Soviet Union law was revoked when Ukraine achieved independence in 1991, there remains a high level of social censure. Political leaders in Ukraine, before and after Euromaidan, have been reluctant to pass anti-discrimination legislation, despite pressure to comply with the Charter of Fundamental Rights of the European Union. After many delays, a law banning workplace discrimination on the basis of sexual orientation or gender identity was finally passed on November 12, 2015. Russian and religious influences continue to threaten the safety and social recognition of LGBT people in Ukraine. Bociurkiw's film draws attention to this struggle and gives voice to the heroes of the Ukrainian LGBT rights movement.

Bociurkiw continues to engage in activist research, teaching, and production; initiating courses like Social Justice Media and #Activism. In 2016, she published the article "Big Affect: The Ephemeral Archive of Second Wave Feminist Video Collectives in Canada," the result of several years' research into Canadian feminist media history and its intersections with broadcast technologies and activism.

Works

Literary works 

Marusya Bociurkiw's work is "cast with stark, memorable details that capture the conflicting essence of families". Her books examine "complex relationships and histories."

The Woman Who Loved Airports (Press Gang Publishers, 1994)
Halfway to the East (Lazara Press, 1999)
The Children of Mary (Inanna Publications, 2006)
Comfort Food for Breakups: The Memoir of a Hungry Girl (Arsenal Pulp Press, 2007)
Feeling Canadian: Television Nationalism & Affect (Wilfrid Laurier University Press, 2011)
 ' 'Food Was Her Country: The Memoir of a Queer Daughter (Dagger Editions / Caitlin Press 2018) ' '
Recipes for Trouble: A World of Food Stories, Culinary Memories, and Ingredients Queerly Political (2012–2013)
The Media Studies Blog (rabble.ca, 2010–2014)
A Girl, Waiting (2015)
Bringing Back Memory in Unbound: Ukrainian Canadians Writing Home (University of Toronto Press, 2016)

Films 

Our Choice, A Tape About Teenage Mothers (Vtape, 1983)
Stronger than Before (Vtape, 1984)
No Small Change (Vtape, 1985)
Playing With Fire (Vtape, 1986)
Bullets for a Revolution (Vtape, 1988)
Night Visions (Vtape, 1989)
Bodies in Trouble (Vtape, 1990)
Nancy Drew & the Mystery of the Haunted Body (Vtape, 1999) 
Unspoken Territory (Moving Images Distribution, 2001)
Flesh and Blood:A Journey Between East and West or What's the Ukrainian Word for Sex? (Moving Images Distribution, 2006)
This is Gay Propaganda: LGBT Rights and the War in Ukraine (Winds of Change Production, 2015)

Awards
Bociurkiw's memoir, Comfort Food for Breakups: The Memoir of a Hungry Girl, received Foreword Magazine's INDIEFAB Book of the Year Award (2007), the Independent Publisher Book Awards (silver) for Best Autobiography/Memoir (2008); and was short-listed for the Golden Crown Literary Award, Lesbian Short Story Essay Collection, and the prestigious Kobzar Literary Award and the Lambda Literary Award (2008). Bociurkiw was the 2013 recipient of the Deans' Scholarly, Research and Creative Activity Award at Ryerson University.  Her short story, "A Girl, Waiting," was short-listed for the 2015 CBC Creative Non-Fiction Award. The anthology Unbound: Ukrainian Canadians Writing Home, which included her story"Bringing Back Memory" won a 2018 Kobzar Award. Her memoir Food Was Her Country was shortlisted for a 2019 Lambda Award.

References

External links 
 Studio for Media Activism and Critical Thought
 Unspoken Territory

Canadian LGBT novelists
Canadian feminists
Film directors from Toronto
Writers from Toronto
Toronto Metropolitan University alumni
1958 births
Canadian memoirists
NSCAD University alumni
Canadian bloggers
Canadian people of Ukrainian descent
Queer feminists
Queer memoirists
Media studies writers
Living people
Academic staff of Toronto Metropolitan University
Film directors from Edmonton
Writers from Edmonton
Canadian women film directors
Canadian women memoirists
Canadian women bloggers
Lesbian memoirists
21st-century memoirists
Canadian LGBT screenwriters
Canadian women screenwriters
Queer screenwriters
Queer novelists
21st-century Canadian LGBT people